The 2021 NCAA Division I women's volleyball tournament began on December 2, 2021 and ended on December 18th, 2021, to determine the Division I National Champion in women's volleyball. Wisconsin won its first NCAA national championship by defeating Big Ten rival Nebraska 3–2. The championship match was played in front of an NCAA record crowd of 18,755.

The Final Four was held at Nationwide Arena in Columbus, Ohio. The national semifinals were held on December 16 and the championship match was held on December 18.

Kentucky, from the Southeastern Conference, was the defending national champion. The Wildcats were eliminated in the second round to Illinois. 

The tournament saw a particularly successful run by the Atlantic Coast Conference. Louisville, having gone a perfect 28-0 in the regular season, earned the first number one overall seed in conference history. Meanwhile, Pittsburgh earned the number three seed, its first top four seed in program history. Both teams utilized their home court advantages to earn their respective first trips to the national semifinals. Thus, the Cardinals and Panthers because the second and third semi-finalists from the conference in tournament history, and first since Florida State in 2011. Additionally, Georgia Tech also advanced to its first Regional Final since 2003, marking the first time the ACC had three Regional Finalists in one tournament. 

While the ACC made history in the semifinals, the Cardinals and Panthers were joined by Wisconsin and Nebraska out of the Big Ten. Wisconsin made its third consecutive trip to the national semifinals, and was seeking its first title. Nebraska was the only semi-finalist who has won a National Championship, doing so five times. This tournament marked the fourteenth straight year that at least one member of the Big Ten reached the semifinal.

Tournament schedule and venues 

The first two rounds, normally referred to as the subregionals, will be played at the sites of the top 16 seeds, replicating the format done in the basketball tournaments. The regionals will be played at four non-predetermined campus sites, which will be announced on December 5.

First and Second Rounds (Subregionals)
 December 2–3
 Gregory Gymnasium, Austin, Texas (Host: University of Texas)
 Ferrell Center, Waco, Texas (Host: Baylor University)
 Holloway Gymnasium, West Lafayette, Indiana (Host: Purdue University)
 Sokol Arena, Omaha, Nebraska (Host: Creighton University)
 O'Connell Center, Gainesville, Florida (Host: University of Florida)
 December 3–4
 L&N Federal Credit Union Arena, Louisville, Kentucky (Host: University of Louisville)
 Petersen Events Center, Pittsburgh, Pennsylvania (Host: University of Pittsburgh)
 UW Field House, Madison, Wisconsin (Host: University of Wisconsin)
 Memorial Coliseum, Lexington, Kentucky (Host: University of Kentucky)
 O'Keefe Gymnasium, Atlanta, Georgia (Host: Georgia Institute of Technology)
 Covelli Center, Columbus, Ohio (Host: Ohio State University)
 Devaney Center, Lincoln, Nebraska (Host: University of Nebraska)
 George A. Smith Fieldhouse, Provo, Utah (Host: Brigham Young University)
 Maturi Pavilion, Minneapolis, Minnesota (Host: University of Minnesota)
 Pauley Pavilion, Los Angeles, California (Host: University of California, Los Angeles)
 Alaska Airlines Arena, Seattle, Washington (Host: University of Washington)

Regional semifinals and finals
 December 9 & 11
 Louisville Regional, Freedom Hall (Host: University of Louisville) 
 Madison Regional, Wisconsin Field House (Host: University of Wisconsin)
 Pittsburgh Regional, Fitzgerald Field House (Host: University of Pittsburgh)
 Austin Regional, Gregory Gymnasium (Host: University of Texas)

National semifinals and championship
 December 16 & 18
 Nationwide Arena, Columbus, Ohio (Host: Ohio State University)

Qualifying teams
The following teams automatically qualified for the 2021 NCAA field by virtue of winning their conference's tournament. Unlike the 2020 tournament that consisted of only 48 teams due to COVID-19, the 2021 tournament returned to the usual format of 64 qualifying teams.

While Penn State remains as the only team to take part in all 41 tournaments, this is the first tournament appearance for Campbell, The Citadel, UIC, Mississippi State, South Alabama, and West Virginia, for a grand total of six teams.

Automatic qualifiers

Tournament seeds

Bracket
The tournament bracket was announced on November 28, 2021. Times are shown in Eastern Standard Time.

Louisville, KY Regional

Schedule

First round

Second round

Regional semifinals

Regional final

Madison, WI Regional

Schedule

First round

Second round

Regional semifinals

Regional final

Pittsburgh, PA Regional

Schedule

First round

Second round

Regional semifinals

Regional final

Austin, TX Regional

Schedule

First round

Second round

Regional semifinals

Regional final

Final Four

National semifinals

National championship

Final Four All-Tournament Team 

Anna Smrek – Most Outstanding Player (Wisconsin)
Dana Rettke (Wisconsin) 
Sydney Hilley (Wisconsin) 
Nicklin Hames (Nebraska) 
Madi Kubik (Nebraska) 
Anna Debeer (Louisville) 
Leketor Member-Meneh (Pittsburgh)

Media coverage
For the second consecutive season all matches aired on the ESPN Family of networks. Rounds 1 and 2 streamed on ESPN+ with the exception of Texas matches, which were televised by LHN.  All Sweet 16 and Elite 8 matches aired on ESPNU or ESPN+. ESPN aired the national semifinals while ESPN2 aired the national championship.

Rounds 1 & 2 

Atlanta: Andy Demetra and Kele Eveland
Austin: Paul Sunderland and Salima Rockwell
Columbus: Brendan Gulick and Greg Franke (Fri); Luke Maloney and Hanna Williford (Sat)
Gainesville: Tom Collett
Lexington: Dick Gabriel and Kathy DeBoer 
Lincoln: Larry Punteney and Kathi Wieskamp
Louisville: Sean Moth and Patty Dennison Norton
Los Angeles: Darren Preston 

Madison: Chris Vosters and Liz Tortorello Nelson
Minneapolis: Johnny Kahner and Meredith Uram
Omaha: Jake Eisenberg and Shannon Smolinski
Pittsburgh: Jason Earle and Amanda Silay
Provo: Jarom Jordan and Amy Gant
Seattle: Jason Dorow
Waco: Lincoln Rose, Katie Smith (Thurs), and Adam Johnson (Fri)
West Lafayette: Cory Palm and Alex Brophy

Regional semifinals & Regional Finals 

Austin: Paul Sunderland and Salima Rockwell 
Louisville: Eric Frede and Katie George

Madison: Courtney Lyle and Karch Kiraly
Pittsburgh: Alex Loeb and Missy Whittemore

Semifinals & National Championship 

Paul Sunderland, Salima Rockwell, and Christine Williamson

Records by Conference

The R32, S16, E8, F4, CM, and NC columns indicate how many teams from each conference were in the Round of 32 (second round), Round of 16 (third round), quarterfinals (Elite Eight), Semi-finals (Final Four), Championship Match, and National Champion, respectively.
The following conferences failed to place a team into the round of 32: America East, Big Sky, Big South, Colonial, Horizon, Ivy, MAAC, MEAC, Missouri Valley, Mountain West, Northeast, Ohio Valley, Patriot, Southern, Southland, SWAC, Summit, Sun Belt, and the WAC. The conference's records have been consolidated in the other row.

NCAA tournament record
The following NCAA Tournament records were broken during the 2021 tournament:
Attendance record, championship match – 18,755

References

NCAA Division I
Women's volleyball
2021 in women's volleyball
NCAA Division 1 Women's Volleyball
NCAA Women's Volleyball Championship
Volleyball in Ohio
Sports competitions in Columbus, Ohio
Tournament